Almudena Arcones Segovia (born 1979) is a Spanish-German nuclear astrophysicist whose research topics have included the creation and decay of heavy elements through the r-process, and neutrino-driven outflows, in energetic stellar events including supernovae and neutron star mergers. She is a professor of theoretical astrophysics at Technische Universität Darmstadt in Germany, and a researcher in the GSI Helmholtz Centre for Heavy Ion Research in Darmstadt.

Education and career
Arcones was born in 1979 in Madrid. She completed a Ph.D. in 2007 through the Max Planck Institute for Astrophysics under the supervision of Hans-Thomas Janka. After postdoctoral research at Technische Universität Darmstadt and then the University of Basel, she returned to Darmstadt with a tenure-track assistant professorship in 2012, and was promoted to associate professor in 2016. She holds a joint appointment in the GSI Helmholtz Centre for Heavy Ion Research in Darmstadt, and from 2012 to 2017 led a Helmholtz Young Investigator Group at the centre.

Recognition
Arcones was named a Fellow of the American Physical Society (APS) in 2020, after a nomination from the APS Division of Nuclear Physics, "for seminal contributions in astro- and nuclear physics, especially to the understanding of heavy elements creation in supernovae, neutron star mergers, and their associated kilonova".

References

External links

1979 births
Living people
Spanish astrophysicists
Spanish women physicists
German astrophysicists
German women physicists
Academic staff of Technische Universität Darmstadt
Fellows of the American Physical Society